Cindy Ninos (born March 27, 1972) is a Greek skeleton racer who competed in the early 2000s. At the 2002 Winter Olympics in Salt Lake City, she finished 13th in the women's skeleton event.

Ninos's best finish at the FIBT World Championships was 24th in the women's skeleton event at Calgary in 2001.

References
2002 women's skeleton results
Skeletonsport.com profile

1972 births
Living people
Greek female skeleton racers
Skeleton racers at the 2002 Winter Olympics
Olympic skeleton racers of Greece